E. spectabilis may refer to:

Elaenia spectabilis, the large elaenia, a bird species
Eragrostis spectabilis, a flowering plant species
Eremophila spectabilis, a flowering plant species
Eucamptognathus spectabilis, a ground beetle species
Eurybia spectabilis, a flowering plant species